Jordan South, previously called Jordan and Jordan East, is one of the 19 constituencies in the Yau Tsim Mong District. The constituency returns one district councillor to the Yau Tsim Mong District Council, with an election every four years.

Councillors represented

1985–94

1994 to present

Election results

2010s

References

Mong Kok
Constituencies of Hong Kong
Constituencies of Yau Tsim Mong District Council
1985 establishments in Hong Kong
Constituencies established in 1985